The 1996–97 Luxembourg Cup was the fourth playing of the Luxembourg Cup ice hockey tournament. Ten teams participated in the tournament, which was won by Tornado Luxembourg.

Final standings

Division A

Division B

External links 
 Season on hockeyarchives.info

Luxembourg Cup
Luxembourg Cup (ice hockey) seasons